Syed Mohammad Ali Bukhari (born 8 November 1973 in Bahawalpur, Punjab, Pakistan) is a former first-class cricketer.

Career

Bukhari was a left-arm fast-medium bowler who played for teams in both Pakistan and England. These teams included:

 Lahore City 1993/1994
 Railways 1993/1994
 Islamabad 1994/1995
 United Bank Limited 1994/1995
 Agriculture Development Bank of Pakistan 1995/1996
 Rawalpindi A 1995/1996
 Bahawalpur 1998/1999
 Wales Minor Counties 1999
 Derbyshire 2002/2004
 Herefordshire County Cricket Club 2005
 Middlesex
 Glamorgan County Cricket Club 

Bukhari made a good debut for Derbyshire in 2002, scoring 53 runs, whilst batting at number nine and taking several crucial wickets in an improbable Derbyshire victory. He took 47 wickets during his debut season, but a succession of injuries affected his progress. His haul of wickets fell to 28 in 2003 and 10 in 2004. He had a slingy left-arm bowling action. He was awarded a contract by Middlesex for 2006 following the granting of a British passport.

Coaching
After his playing career ended Bukhari became a pace bowling coach.

References

External links
Mohammad Ali at Cricinfo
Mohammad Ali at Cricket Archive

1973 births
Living people
Pakistani cricketers
Derbyshire cricketers
Middlesex cricketers
Pakistani emigrants to the United Kingdom
Wales National County cricketers
Herefordshire cricketers
Lahore City cricketers
Pakistan Railways cricketers
United Bank Limited cricketers
Islamabad cricketers
Zarai Taraqiati Bank Limited cricketers
Bahawalpur cricketers
Cricketers from Bahawalpur
English cricketers
British Asian cricketers
British sportspeople of Pakistani descent